After the foundation of the Deutsche Reichsbahn the Bavarian Group Administration tasked the firm of Maffei with the construction of 80 locomotives of the Bavarian Class P 3/5 H. These machines were based on the Class P 3/5 N, but had a superheated steam boiler. Positive experience with these vehicles built in 1921 – they were even used on express train duties – led in 1924 to the rebuild of all available Class P 3/5 N engines into superheated steam locomotives. 

In 1925 the P 3/5 H were allocated the numbers 38 401 to 38 480 as part of the DRG Class 38.4.

All 80 locomotives survived the Second World War and entered service with the Deutsche Bundesbahn. The last engine of this class, number 38 432, ran in Bavaria and Upper Swabia and was taken out of service in 1955.

The vehicles were coupled with a Bavarian 2′2′ T 21,8 tender.

See also 
 Royal Bavarian State Railways
 List of Bavarian locomotives and railbuses

References 

4-6-0 locomotives
P 3 5 H
Standard gauge locomotives of Germany
Maffei locomotives
Railway locomotives introduced in 1921
2′C h4v locomotives
Passenger locomotives